Gravitational energy or gravitational potential energy is the potential energy a massive object has in relation to another massive object due to gravity. It is the potential energy associated with the gravitational field, which is released (converted into kinetic energy) when the objects fall towards each other. Gravitational potential energy increases when two objects are brought further apart.

For two pairwise interacting point particles, the gravitational potential energy  is given by 

Close to the Earth's surface, the gravitational field is approximately constant, and the gravitational potential energy of an object reduces to

Newtonian mechanics 

In classical mechanics, two or more masses always have a gravitational potential. Conservation of energy requires that this gravitational field energy is always negative, so that it is zero when the objects are infinitely far apart. The gravitational potential energy is the potential energy an object has because it is within a gravitational field.

The force between a point mass, and another point mass, is given by Newton's law of gravitation:

To get the total work done by an external force to bring point mass  from infinity to the final distance  (for example the radius of Earth) of the two mass points, the force is integrated with respect to displacement:

Because , the total work done on the object can be written as:

In the common situation where a much smaller mass  is moving near the surface of a much larger object with mass , the gravitational field is nearly constant and so the expression for gravitational energy can be considerably simplified.

If  is small, as it must be close to the surface where  is constant, then this expression can be simplified using the binomial approximation

to

Taking  at the surface (instead of at infinity), the familiar expression for gravitational potential energy emerges:

General relativity 

In general relativity gravitational energy is extremely complex, and there is no single agreed upon definition of the concept. It is sometimes modelled via the Landau–Lifshitz pseudotensor that allows retention for the energy–momentum conservation laws of classical mechanics. Addition of the matter stress–energy tensor to the Landau–Lifshitz pseudotensor results in a combined matter plus gravitational energy pseudotensor that has a vanishing 4-divergence in all frames—ensuring the conservation law. Some people object to this derivation on the grounds that pseudotensors are inappropriate in general relativity, but the divergence of the combined matter plus gravitational energy pseudotensor is a tensor.

See also 
 Gravitational binding energy
 Gravitational potential
 Gravitational potential energy storage
 Positive energy theorem

References 

Forms of energy
Gravity
Conservation laws
Tensors in general relativity
Potentials